Barrett Carter (born October 23, 2002) is an American football linebacker for the Clemson Tigers.

Early life and high school
Carter grew up in Suwanee, Georgia and attended North Gwinnett High School. As a junior, he recorded 73 tackles and 10 sacks. Carter was rated a four-star recruit and committed to play college football at Clemson over offers from Georgia, Auburn, and Ohio State.

College career
Carter played in 12 games as a freshman. He entered his sophomore season as a starter at linebacker.

References

External links
Clemson Tigers bio

Living people
Players of American football from Georgia (U.S. state)
American football linebackers
Clemson Tigers football players
Year of birth missing (living people)